Thomas Wilson was Dean of Carlisle from 1764 until his death on 25 September 1778.

Wilson was educated at Giggleswick School and Christ's College, Cambridge. He was Vicar of Torpenhow from 1743.

References

1778 deaths
Deans of Carlisle